Wielka Wieś  is a village in the administrative district of Gmina Stąporków, within Końskie County, Świętokrzyskie Voivodeship, in south-central Poland.

The village has a population of 650.

References

Villages in Końskie County